Carol Goar is a Canadian journalist and was an editorial columnist for the Toronto Star until April 2016. She previously served as the newspaper's editorial page editor, Washington bureau chief and national affairs columnist. Prior to joining the Star, Goar also worked for Maclean's, the Ottawa Citizen and Canadian Press.

She won National Newspaper Awards in 1986 and 1997.

References

External links
Carol Goar's columns at the Toronto Star

Canadian columnists
Living people
Toronto Star people
Canadian women journalists
Canadian women columnists
Canadian political journalists
Canadian women non-fiction writers
Year of birth missing (living people)